Darvishan Bar (also Romanized as Darvīshān Bar; also known as Darvīshāneh Bar) is a village in Divshal Rural District, in the Central District of Langarud County, Gilan Province, Iran. At the 2006 census, its population was 772, in 222 families.

References 

Populated places in Langarud County